James J. O'Brien  (born August 10, 1935, died September 20, 2016) was an emeritus Robert O. Lawton Professor of Meteorology and Oceanography at Florida State University. He stated that "sea level in Florida is going to continue to rise period. That's without any global warming."

O'Brien got his bachelor's degree from Rutgers University before obtaining his M.Sc. and Ph.D. from Texas A&M University.

He was a fellow of the Norwegian Academy of Science and Letters from 2000.

Notes
Prof. James J. O'Brien from FSU is not the same person as Jim O'Brien, Chair and Co-founder of the Irish Climate Science Forum. The latter Jim O'Brien is best known for his promotion of the idea that climate change is not problematic and that it will benefit the planet.

References

1935 births
2016 deaths
American oceanographers
Florida State University faculty
Texas A&M University alumni
Rutgers University alumni
Members of the Norwegian Academy of Science and Letters